Community theatre refers to any theatrical performance made in relation to particular communities—its usage includes theatre made by, with, and for a community. It may refer to a production that is made entirely by a community with no outside help, or a collaboration between community members and professional theatre artists, or a performance made entirely by professionals that is addressed to a particular community. Community theatres range in size from small groups led by single individuals that perform in borrowed spaces to large permanent companies with well-equipped facilities of their own. Many community theatres are successful, non-profit businesses with a large active membership and, often, a full-time staff. Community theatre is often devised and may draw on popular theatrical forms, such as carnival, circus, and parades, as well as performance modes from commercial theatre. This type of theatre is ever-changing and evolving due to the influences of the community; the artistic process can often be heavily effected by the community's socioeconomic circumstances.

There is a certain obligation that community theatre is held to because of the personal and physical connection to its own community and the people within that community. Community theatre is understood to contribute to the social capital of a community, insofar as it develops the skills, community spirit, and artistic sensibilities of those who participate, whether as producers or audience members. It is used as a tool for social development, promoting ideas like gender equality, human rights, environment, and democracy. Most of the community theatre practices have been developed based on the philosophy of education theorist Paulo Freire's approach of critical pedagogy in theatre and implementation techniques built by Augusto Boal, known as Theatre of the Oppressed. Freire's approach attempted to stimulate social change by encouraging the audience to build capacities for critical thinking through participation in active dialogue. The participants would identify issues of concerns, and discuss possible solutions, with an enhanced tolerance for different perspectives with regard to the same problem. Such plays are then rarely performed in traditional playhouses but rather staged on streets, public places, traditional meeting spaces, schools, prisons, or other institutions, inviting an alternative and often spontaneous audience to watch.

Community theatre is distinct from amateur theatre which, while it may be community-based, is always non-professional whereas community theatre can be considered professional theatre.

Geographical variations

In Latin America 
Partly inspired by Antonio Gramsci's interpretation of culture, the seminal theatre practitioner Augusto Boal developed a series of techniques known as the Theatre of the Oppressed from his work developing community theatre in Latin America.

In the United Kingdom 
In Britain the term "community theatre" is sometimes used to distinguish theatre made by professional theatre artists with or for particular communities from that made entirely by non-professionals, which is usually known as "amateur theatre" or "amateur dramatics." Notable practitioners include Joan Littlewood and her Theatre Workshop, John McGrath and Elizabeth MacLennan and their 7:84 company, Welfare State International, and Ann Jellicoe founder of the Colway Theatre Trust, now known as the Claque Theatre and run by UK practitioner Jon Oram.

In the Netherlands 
Community theatre in the Netherlands came about after the ending of the theatre in education movement, which lasted from 1970-1985. The big theatre in the Netherlands which was created originally for theatre in education and subsequently community theatre, is the Stut Theatre. This theatre idea began in 1977 by Jos Bours and Marlies Hautvast, who when they first started creating plays at the Stut Theatre, realized this kind of community theatre had a completely different approach from theatre in education.

In the United States 

Community theatre in the United States was an outgrowth of the Little Theatre Movement, a reform movement which began in 1912 in reaction to massive Victorian melodramatic theatre spectacles. However, the country's oldest extant community theatre venue, Gates Hall in Pultneyville, New York, has existed since the 19th century and presented amateur performances every year since 1867.

The American Association of Community Theatre represents community theaters in the U.S., its territories, and its military bases around the world.

In Canada 
Theatre Passe Muraille sent ensemble casts into rural communities to record local stories, songs, accents and lifestyle. Their employment of collective creation was thus taken to an unheard of scale and spread across Canada. Passe Muraille facilitated the first production of Codco, which employed personal experiences of Newfoundland culture in their shows.

The Boardmore Playhouse, named in honor of Elizabeth and Harry Boardmore, is a 337-seat venue which is the centre for the performing arts at Cape Breton University. The Playhouse is home to CBU Boardmore Theatre which presents an annual season of plays, including plays for young audiences, four to five full-length plays, a bi-annual Shakespeare production and a bi-annual Broadway Musical, and a one-week one act play festival with an emphasis on new play development. Throughout the school year and summer months the CBU Boardmore Playhouse is also involved with a number of community projects. The Playhouse provides practical expertise to community theatre groups in the form of workshops for young people as well as advice and leadership in summer theatre programs. Open auditions are held each September for anyone interested in getting involved in any aspect of the theatre. Auditions are held the weekend following the first week of classes.

In Australia and New Zealand 
In Western Australia, there is a substantial number of community theatre groups who have banded together to form the Independent Theatre Association.

The South Canterbury Drama League is a community theatre based in Timaru, New Zealand.

Churches and community theatre 
Ecclesiastical communities often encourage theatrical productions, be the for youth or adults. The Christmas Play is a tenet of modern church theatre. In addition to performing in the church itself, many parishes have halls for performances. In the nineteenth century, Christians in European and North American often performed plays in chruch halls or other rented spaces, often using the proceeds from donations and tickets for charity.

Communism and proletarian community theatre 
Soviet initiatives like the Petrograd Politprosvet and Central Agitational Studio performed improvisational theater in the 1920s as a pedagogical project to tell stories about Marxist values and anti-capitalist englightenment. In 1923, the Twelfth Communist Party Congress voted to support their work for the improvement of proletarian life. The performers rejected traditional forms of theater and called themselves activists instead.

See also

 Community arts
 Forum theatre
 Interactive theatre
 Participatory theatre
 Theatre for Development (TFD)

References

Sources

 Banham, Martin, ed. 1998. The Cambridge Guide to Theatre. Cambridge: Cambridge UP. .
 Boal, Augusto. 2008. Theatre of the Oppressed. New ed. London: Pluto. .
 Bradby, David, and John McCormick. 1978. People's Theatre. London: Croom Helm and Totowa, NJ: Rowman and Littlefield. .
 Coult, Tony, and Baz Kershaw, eds. 1983. Engineers of the Imagination: The Welfare State Handbook. London: Methuen. .
 Gooch, Steve. 1984. All Together Now: An Alternative View of Theatre and the Community. Methuen Theatrefile Ser. London: Methuen. .
 Heddon, Deirdre, and Jane Milling. 2005. Devising Performance: A Critical History. Theatre & Performance Practices ser. London: Palgrave Macmillan. .
 Kershaw, Baz. 1992. The Politics of Performance: Radical Theatre as Cultural Intervention. London and New York: Routledge. .
 MacLennan, Elizabeth. 1990. The Moon Belongs to Everyone: Making Theatre with 7:84. London: Methuen. .
 McGrath, John. 1981. A Good Night Out: Popular Theatre: Audience, Class and Form. London: Nick Hern Books, 1996. .
 McGrath, John. 1990. The Bone Won't Break: On Theatre and Hope in Hard Times. London: Methuen. .
 McGrath, John. 1996. Six-Pack: Plays for Scotland. Edinburgh: Polygon. .
 Noe, Marcia. 2005. "The Women of Provincetown, 1915-1922/Composing Ourselves: The Little Theatre Movement and the American Audience." Review. American Drama (Winter). Available online.
 Schechter, Joel, ed. 2003. Popular Theatre: A Sourcebook. Worlds of Performance Ser. London and New York: Routledge. .
 Van Erven, Eugene. 2001. Community Theatre: Global Perspectives. New York, NY: Routledge. .
 Scharinger, J. 2013. Participatory theater, is it really? A critical examination of practices in Timor-Leste. ASEAS - Austrian Journal of South-East Asian Studies,6(1),102-119. Available here.

 
Theatrical genres